Estadio Rafael Calles Pinto is a multi-use stadium in Guanare, Venezuela. It is mostly used for football matches and is the home stadium of Llaneros de Guanare. The stadium holds 13,000 people.

References

Rafael Calles Pinto
Llaneros de Guanare
Sport in Portuguesa (state)
Buildings and structures in Portuguesa (state)
Buildings and structures in Guanare
Athletics (track and field) venues in Venezuela